Oeneis jutta, the Jutta Arctic or Baltic grayling, is a species of butterfly in the subfamily Satyrinae with a Circumboreal distribution. It occurs in bogs and tundra in the north of Europe, the Baltic states, the Urals, Siberia, northern Kazakhstan, the Russian Far East, northern Mongolia, northeastern China, North Korea, and northern North America (Canada from Newfoundland to British Columbia). Larvae feed on Carex and Eriophorum, possibly also Glyceria, Molinia, and Juncus. Ledum palustre is the preferred nectar plant of the adult butterflies. The species has one generation every one or two years, depending on the location.

Subspecies
Listed alphabetically:
Oeneis jutta akoene Belik & Yakovlev, 1998 − Altai, western Tuva
Oeneis jutta alaskensis Holland, 1900 − Alaska, Yukon, northern British Columbia
Oeneis jutta ascerta Masters & Sorenson, 1968 − southeastern Manitoba, Ontario, Quebec, Minnesota, Wisconsin, northern Michigan, northern Maine, northern New Hampshire
Oeneis jutta balderi (Geyer, 1837) − Newfoundland
Oeneis jutta chermocki Wyatt, 1965 − western Alberta, southern British Columbia
Oeneis jutta harperi Chermock, 1969 − northern Manitoba, eastern Northwest Territories
Oeneis jutta jutta
Oeneis jutta leussleri Bryant, 1935 − western Northwest Territories
Oeneis jutta reducta McDunnough, 1929
Oeneis jutta ridingiana F. & R. Chermock, 1940 − southwestern Manitoba, Saskatchewan
Oeneis jutta sibirica Kurentzov, 1970 − Yakutia, Magadan, Chukot Peninsula

References 

Oeneis
Insects of the Arctic
Butterflies of Europe